Exercise Space Flag is a United States Space Force (USSF) exercise dedicated to providing tactical space units with advanced training in a contested, degraded, and operationally-limited (CDO) environment. The intent of Space Flag is to provide space forces with realistic, threat-based training to enhance their ability to analyze and respond to current and future threats within a broader warfighting context. Space Flag is the USSF's sole large-force employment exercise focused on gaining and maintaining space superiority and was modeled after the U.S. Air Force's Red Flag Exercise.

With the activation of Space Training and Readiness Delta Provisional (STAR Delta) on 24 July 2020, the unit responsible for Space Flag has been re-organized under STAR Delta and temporarily re-designated STAR Delta, Operating Location-Alpha (OL-A). STAR Delta, OL-A was previously known as Distributed Mission Operations Center-Space (DMOC-S) or the 705th Combat Training Squadron (CTS), OL-A and is located at Schriever Air Force Base, Colorado.

The first Space Flag was held in April 2017.  For the first two calendar years—2017 and 2018—Space Flag occurred twice per year.  Starting in 2019, Space Flag increased to three times per year, with one iteration as a coalition event.  Space Flag 19-3 in August 2019, was the first event to include coalition partners from Australia, Canada, Great Britain, and the United States.

The 527th Space Aggressor Squadron and 26th Space Aggressor Squadron operate the red cell and provide Opposing force functions or OPFOR for Space Flag.

Notable appearances in media 
Space Flag was loosely referenced in episode 5 of the Netflix series Space Force (TV series).

References 

United States Space Force